The flageolet bean is a variety of the common bean (Phaseolus vulgaris) originating from France. The flageolet is picked before full maturity and dried in the shade to retain its green color. The bean is small, light green, and kidney-shaped. The texture is firm and creamy when shelled and cooked. The flageolet bean is commonly grown in the fertile soil of California.

Flageolet bean varieties include:
 Chevrier (the original heirloom)
 Elsa
 Flambeau
 Flamingo

References

Phaseolus
Edible legumes